HC Andersen (also known as HCA) is a Finnish rock band group named after Hans Christian Andersen. It is known for its mixture of punk rock, pan-European folk music, and humour.

HC Andersen consists of Jake Romppanen, Ema Hurskainen, Pakke Pakarinen, Olli "Ola" Nurminen, and Samuli "Teho" Majamäki.

HC Andersen is best known for its albums 5 vuodenaikaa (Finnish for "Five Seasons",  released in 1990), Hämäyksen koston pojan paluu II (Finnish for "The Revenge of Cheat's Sons, Part 2",  released in 1993), and Eventyr (Danish for "adventure" or "fairy tale",  released in 1997).  Eventyr received critical acclaim in the Finnish music media.

Finnish musical groups